Užava parish is an administrative unit of the Ventspils Municipality, Latvia. The parish has a population of 619 (as of 1/07/2010) and covers an area of 125.518 km2.

History 
The territory of modern Užava parish historically housed Sārnate manor (Gut Sernaten, east of  ) and Užava manor (Gut Hasau, Užava).
Užava parish was established during the First World War, separating it from Ziras Parish. In 1935, the area of Užava parish was 138 km2 and 1947 inhabitants lived there. In 1945, Užava, Lībciems and Sārnate village councils were established in the parish, but in 1949 the parish was liquidated. The village of Užava belonged to Ventspils (1949-1962), Kuldīga (1962-1967) and again Ventspils (after 1967) districts. In 1950, the village of Lībciems was added to the village of Užava, but in 1961 it was part of the village of Jūrkalne. In 1990, the village was reorganized into a parish. In 2009, Užava parish was included as an administrative territory in Ventspils region.

Villages of Užava parish 
 
 
 
 
 Užava (parish center)

See also 
 Užava lowland

References 

Parishes of Latvia
Ventspils Municipality